Amminbhavi is a village in Belgaum district in the southern state of Karnataka, India.
It is one of the villages in the Belgaum district.

Demographics 
Since 2000 the literacy rate is increasing. It was 15% in 1985, 20% in 1990, 25% in 1995, 30% in 2000, 40% in 2005, and now (2011) it has reached 58%.
The total population of Amminabhavi consists of 90% Hindu and 10% Muslim.

References

Villages in Belagavi district